Peter Forras (born 13 January 1964) is an Australian former alpine skier. He competed in two events at the 1988 Winter Olympics.

References

External links
 

1964 births
Living people
Australian male alpine skiers
Olympic alpine skiers of Australia
Alpine skiers at the 1988 Winter Olympics
Place of birth missing (living people)